Green Acres Baptist Church is a Baptist megachurch based in Tyler, Texas. It is affiliated with the Southern Baptist Convention. The church has a total membership of over 17,000 with an average weekend attendance around 4,000. Dr. Michael Gossett is the Senior Pastor and took that role on Sunday August 29, 2021.

History
The church was founded in 1955. In 1991, David Dykes became the Senior pastor. In 2013, the church had 14,000 members. On August 29, 2021, Dr. Michael Gossett officially became the Senior Pastor of Green Acres.

References

External links
 Green Acres Baptist Church website

Baptist churches in Texas
Buildings and structures in Tyler, Texas
Evangelical megachurches in the United States
Megachurches in Texas
Southern Baptist Convention churches